TCP may refer to:

Science and technology
 Transformer coupled plasma
 Tool Center Point, see Robot end effector

Computing
 Transmission Control Protocol, a fundamental Internet standard
 Telephony control protocol, a Bluetooth communication standard

Medicine
 TCP (antiseptic)
 Tenocyclidine, an anesthetic drug
 Toxin-coregulated pilus, a protein that allows Vibrio cholerae to adhere to enterocytes
 Transcutaneous pacing

Chemistry
 1,2,3-Trichloropropane, an industrial solvent
 Thermal conversion process, a depolymerization process for producing crude oil from waste
 Tocopherols, a class of methylated phenols
 Tricalcium phosphate, an anticaking agent
 Trichlorophenol, any organochloride of phenol that contains three covalently bonded chlorine atoms
 Tricresyl phosphate, an organophosphate compound

Organizations
 Taiwan Communist Party, a political party in Taiwan
 Text Creation Partnership, an archival digitization effort at the University of Michigan, US
 The Children's Place, a US retailer
 The Clergy Project, US nonprofit helping clergy leave the ministry
 Top Cow Productions, a US comics publisher
 Trading Corporation of Pakistan, a Pakistani government organization
 Terceiro Comando Puro, a Brazilian criminal organization

Other uses
 Taba International Airport (IATA code), Egypt
 Three card poker, a card game
 Two-candidate-preferred vote, in the Australian electoral system

See also
 FAST TCP, a TCP congestion avoidance algorithm
 TCP/IP, the Internet protocol suite